Red is a two-handed play by American writer John Logan about artist Mark Rothko. It was first produced by the Donmar Warehouse, London, on December 8, 2009, in a production Michael Grandage. It then transferred to Broadway in March 2010 with the same two leads, Alfred Molina and Eddie Redmayne, where it won many Tony Awards.

The play has subsequently been performed in many locations around the world, with a 2018 revival in London directed by Grandage, with and Molina reprising his original role as Rothko.

Synopsis
"There is only one thing I fear in life, my friend... One day the black will swallow the red."

Mark Rothko is in his New York studio in 1958/59, having been commissioned to paint a group of murals for the expensive and exclusive Four Seasons restaurant. He gives orders to his assistant, Ken, as Ken mixes the paints, makes the frames, and primes the canvases. Ken, however, eventually brashly questions Rothko's theories of art and his acceding to work on such a commercial project. For his part, Rothko dislikes the rise of pop art.

Ultimately, Rothko stops working on the project and decides to return the money. He explains to Ken that the Four Seasons is an inappropriate place for his murals to be seen.

Original production
The original production at the Donmar Warehouse, premiering on December 8, 2009, was directed by Michael Grandage and performed by Alfred Molina as Rothko and Eddie Redmayne as his fictional assistant Ken.

The production, with its two leads, transferred to Broadway at the  John Golden Theatre for a limited engagement which began on March 11, 2010, and closed on June 27.

Reception
Reviews for the London production were mixed for the play but positive for Molina's performance. Michael Billington in The Guardian wrote: "Alfred Molina, with his large frame and beetling eyebrows, has exactly the fierce intensity of an artist whose paintings were a dynamic battle between Apollo and Dionysus".

In reviewing the Broadway production, Michael Kuchwara of the Associated Press wrote: "They are the tantalizing first words of Red, John Logan's engrossing, often enthralling new play about art, an artist and the act of creation." Those first words were "What do you see?" Variety wrote that "Alfred Molina is majestic".

Awards and nominations
The Broadway production won the 2010 Drama League Award for Distinguished Production of a Play and Molina won the Distinguished Performance Award.

It won the most awards at the 2010 Tonys, including Best Play for Logan and Best Performance by a Featured Actor in a Play for Redmayne. The production was nominated for a total of seven Tony Awards, winning six, including: Best Play, Best Featured Actor in a Play for Eddie Redmayne, Best Direction of a Play for Michael Grandage, Best Scenic Design of a Play for Christopher Oram, Best Lighting Design of a Play for Neil Austin, and Best Sound Design of a Play for Adam Cork. In addition, Alfred Molina was nominated for the Tony Award for Best Actor in a Play for his role as Mark Rothko. All in all, it received the most wins out of any other production that season. The play also won the Drama Desk Award for Outstanding Play while Grandage and Austin were honoured with Drama Desk Awards for their work. Molina, Cork and Oram were also similarly nominated.

Other productions

The third production of Red was – at Logan's insistence – put on by the South Australian amateur theatre company Independent Theatre in 2011, at  The Space, in Adelaide's Festival Centre. David Roach (who also designed the set) played Rothko, and Paul-William Mawhinney took the role of Ken. The play received good reviews.

In October 2013, the play premiered in Chile at Centro Mori Bellavista theatre under the title Rojo, starring Luis Gnecco and Martin Bacigalupo, directed by Rodrigo Sepúlveda and produced by The Cow Company.

Geva Theatre Center in Rochester, New York, mounted a production of Red in October/November 2015, starring Stephen Caffrey as Mark Rothko and John Ford-Dunker as Ken. Directed by Skip Greer, the production featured scenic design by Robert Koharchik, costume design by Ann M. Emo, lighting design by Kendall Smith and sound design by Dan Roach.

Red played in the Pit at the New National Theatre Tokyo from August to October 2015, starring Tetsushi Tanaka as Rothko and Shun Oguri as Ken, directed by Eriko Ogawa.

In October 2016 the play opened at The Junction in Dubai before transferring to the JamJar. The production starred Osman Aboubakr as Rothko and Deepak Venugopal as Ken, with direction by Alex Broun.

In July/August 2017, the play was mounted at the Cape Playhouse in Dennis, Massachusetts. Stephen Caffrey starred as Mark Rothko and Patrick Stafford as Ken, with direction by David Glenn Armstrong.

The play was revived from May to July 2018 at the Wyndham's Theatre in London's West End directed by Michael Grandage, with Alfred Enoch as Ken, and Alfred Molina reprising his original role as Rothko. From this production, a film was made for Public Broadcasting Stations (PBS) in the US and aired November 15, 2019.

Works referenced in the play
The play references other works of art, including:
 The Birth of Tragedy by Friedrich Nietzsche.

Footnotes

References

External links

Probst, Andy. "Review Roundup: Red, with Alfred Molina, at Donmar Warehouse", theatermania.com, December 10, 2009
 Behind the Scenes: Red, by John Logan. Background material prepared for Ensemble Theatre Company by Anna Jensen.

2009 plays
American plays
Broadway plays
Plays based on actual events
Plays set in New York City
Tony Award-winning plays
Works based on art
Mark Rothko
Two-handers